Spanish New Zealanders refers to New Zealand citizens and residents of Spanish descent, or people who were born in Spain and emigrated to New Zealand. There are approximately 2,043 New Zealanders who are full or partial Spanish descent, most of whom reside within the major cities of Auckland and Wellington.

Immigration to New Zealand from Spain was minimal during the 1850s and 1860s resulting from the social disruption of the Carlist civil wars. Larger numbers of Spanish immigrants entered the country in the first quarter of the twentieth century due to the same circumstances of rural poverty and urban congestion that led other Europeans to emigrate in that period, as well as unpopular wars. Many immigrants either moved back to Spain or to another country. Spaniards married Latin Americans aside from European New Zealanders and Māori because of cultural proximity, and in 20th century, Spaniards and Latin Americans joined forces for cultural activities and to promote the teaching of Spanish in New Zealand.

See also
 European New Zealanders
 Europeans in Oceania
 Immigration to New Zealand
 New Zealand–Spain relations
 Pakeha
 Spanish Australians
 Spanish immigration to Hawaii

References

 

 
European New Zealander
Spanish diaspora